Jugon-les-Lacs-Commune-Nouvelle (literally Jugon-les-Lacs New Commune) is a commune in the Côtes-d'Armor department of western France. The municipality was established on 1 January 2016 and consists of the former communes of Jugon-les-Lacs and Dolo.

Population

See also 
Communes of the Côtes-d'Armor department

References 

Jugonleslacscommunenouvelle

Communes nouvelles of Côtes-d'Armor
Populated places established in 2016
2016 establishments in France